Guo zi, also called eight samples of xuzhou, is a traditional Chinese sweet food including eight kinds of xiaochi and popular in the northern regions. People usually eat it in festival or ceremony. The Guo zi is not one food, but a collection of eight food items: Mi san dao, Yang jiao mi, Tiao su, Ma pian, Hua sheng tang, Jin qian bing, Nuo mi tiao and Gui hua su tang. Every food item has its own source, name and production method. Most items in Guo zi occurred in Chinese northern regions and the Guo zi occurred in Xu zhou in final. People usually send Guo zi to families or friends in festival or ceremony as a symbol of blessing. Nowadays, many people buy these items individually and the Guo zi, as a collection, becomes a symbol of festivals or ceremonies.

Mi san dao

Introduction 
Misandao is a Chinese traditional pastry made by honey. The name is relevant to its production method. Because the model should be cut three times on its surface to make it easy to absorb honey when it is fried, the food has three knife slits. Therefore, it is called misandao.

History 
The Mi san dao has a deep relation with Su shi. Legend has it that in the son dynasty, Su Dongpo was the governor of Xuzhou. His friend invited him to evaluate a treasure knife. After drink, his friend gave Su Dongpo the knife to evaluate. He was very surprised as it was really a treasure knife. So, Su Dongpo took the sword and cut three knives on the green stone in the place they drank. As he bent over it, the stone had left three deep cuts.

Then, the servant brought up the pastries, which contained a new kind of sweet pastry. This is made by his friend and, because su dongpo had a sweet tooth, his friend hoped Su Dongpo could give the sweet pastry a name. Su Dongpo tasted sweet as honey and very happy. Because of the three cuts on the stone and there are also three cuts on the food surface, Su Dongpo called the food "honey three knife".(Chinese as “Mi san dao”)

Ingredients 
flour, caramel, vegetable oil, sesame

Yang jiao mi

Introduction 
This is the traditional pastry in Xu zhou, Jiang su province. It is shaped like a ram's horn, with honey in it. So, it is named for its shape, like goat's horn and plum beans, and contains honey.

History 
In Chinese folklore, Xiang Yu has a battle with Liu Bang. When the army was tired and hungry, a shepherd boy gave Xiang Yu and Yu Ji a honey contained by a ram's horn. After drunk, the Xiang Yu and Yu Ji felt very relaxed and happy. Then, Xiang Yu gave the shepherd his sword and the gold and silver in his army. When Xiang Yu went to his palace. He ordered his cook to make the food by flour and honey.

Ingredients 
flour, vegetable oil, white sugar, malt syrup

Tiao su

Introduction 
Tiao su is a kind of Han Chinese snacks in jiangnan region

Ingredients 
Flour, Cinnamon sugar, granulated sugar, syrup

Ma Pian

Introduction 
The Ma Pian is a delicious traditional Chinese food item

Ingredients 
Flour, sugar, yeast, water, edible oil

Hua Sheng Tang

Introduction 
Hua sheng tang is an ancient Chinese food item

History 
Folklore said that the earliest Hua sheng tang is made in Warring States period (https://en.wikipedia.org/wiki/Warring_States_period). At that time, there are usually wars in China. Therefore, rich people usually went to other place to avoid the war. When they went to other places, some people cook caramel and peanuts together. After cooling, they cut the candy into different small pieces. And this is the earliest peanuts sugar.

Ingredients 
Flour, sugar, yeast flour, water, oil, alkali

Jin Qian Bing

Introduction 
The Jin qian bing is a kind of jiangsu local snack made from white sparrow cowpeas, such as the size of a coin.

Ingredients 
Flour, sugar, vegetable oil, water, soda, ammonia powder, sesame seed, essence.

Nuo Mi Tiao

Introduce 
Nuo mi tiao is a han Chinese snack, which is a must-have food for Spring Festival in old days.

Ingredients 
Glutinous rice noodles, white sugar, caramel, peanut oil .

References 

Chinese desserts